The Hofbräu-Festzelt is one of the largest beer tents of the Oktoberfest in Munich, Germany.

The tent has an area of 5,084 m² and 4,460 seats (plus 1,436 on the balcony) and 1,000 non-seating tables only inside. The outside area measures 2,000 m² with 3,022 additional seats.

The brewery Hofbräuhaus, the tent's sponsor, has been active in Oktoberfest since 1955. The current tent was built in 1972. The tent needs three months to be erected every year. During the 16-day-long festivities of Oktoberfest 2004, a total of 500,000 liters of beer and 70,000 whole roast chickens were consumed.

External links

 

Oktoberfest
Buildings and structures in Munich
Drinking establishments in Germany
German beer culture